The Nisaean plain (also spelled Nesaean) was a fertile plain in Media, a historic region in Iran. It was best known for being the home of the esteemed Nisaean horse. The plain may be identical with the Nisaya district mentioned in the Behistun Inscription of Darius the Great (522–486 BC). However, Rüdiger Schmitt notes that this cannot be strictly proven. The name of the plain possibly survived into the Medieval era, as Yaqut al-Hamawi, writing in the 13th century, mentioned a town in Hamadan (ancient Ecbatana) with the name Nisa. The city of Nahavand is located on the Nisaean plain.

Notes

References

Sources
 
 

Hamadan
Plains of Iran